The 2017 Women's Six Nations Championship, also known as the 2017 RBS Women's Six Nations due to the tournament's sponsorship by the Royal Bank of Scotland, was the 16th series of the Women's Six Nations Championship, an annual women's rugby union competition between six European rugby union national teams. Matches were held in February and March 2017, on the same weekends as the men's tournament, if not always the same day.

For the first time, the 2017 tournament used the rugby union bonus points system common to most other professional rugby union tournaments. As well as the standard four points for a win or two for a draw, a team scoring four or more tries during a match received an additional league table point, as did a team losing by 7 or fewer points. Additionally, to ensure that a team winning all of its five matches (a Grand Slam) would also win the Championship, three bonus points were awarded for this achievement.

Table

* England were awarded an extra 3 table points for achieving the Grand Slam.

Fixtures

Week 1

Week 2

Week 3

Week 4

Week 5

Statistics

Top points scorers

Top try scorers

References

External links
The official RBS Six Nations Site 

2017
2017 rugby union tournaments for national teams
2016–17 in Irish rugby union
2016–17 in English rugby union
2016–17 in Welsh rugby union
2016–17 in Scottish rugby union
2016–17 in French rugby union
2016–17 in Italian rugby union
Six
rugby union
rugby union
rugby union
rugby union
rugby union
Women
rugby union
Women's Six Nations
Women's Six Nations